In snooker, a century break (also century, sometimes called a ton) is a  of 100 points or more, compiled in one  to the table. A century break requires potting at least 25 consecutive balls, and the ability to score centuries is regarded as a mark of the highest skill in snooker. Ronnie O'Sullivan has described a player's first century break as the "ultimate milestone for any snooker player".

In the 2013–14 season, Neil Robertson became the first player to compile 100 century breaks in a single season—a number that only some 60 other players have surpassed throughout their entire careers—and ended the season with 103 centuries, a record number for one season. In 2019–20, Judd Trump became the second player to achieve a "century of centuries", ending the season with 102 century breaks. O'Sullivan holds the record for the most career centuries and is the only player to have achieved 1,000 century breaks, a milestone he reached in the final frame of the 2019 Players Championship in Preston.

Rules 

A century  is a score of 100 points or more within one  to the table. The player does this by potting  and  alternately, where the coloured balls are repositioned on their starting locations. After repositioning the coloured ball paired to the last red on the table, the six coloured balls are potted in order of their increasing value. Because a break is defined as series of consecutive  by a player during a single , scoring 100 points over the course of a whole frame does not necessarily constitute a century break, as it must be done on a single turn at the table. Points for a foul shot by the opponent do not count in a player's break.

Under normal circumstances, the highest possible century in snooker is 147 (a "maximum break"), composed of 15 reds (one point each), 15 blacks (seven points each) and the six remaining colours; yellow, green, brown, blue, pink and black potted consecutively (two through seven points each for a total of 27). If for example only the least-valued colour (yellow, two points) would be used instead of the black ball, the break value would only be 72 points. To score one, there must be at least ten reds on the table when the player comes to play since if there are only nine reds left, only 99 (= 9 × (1 + 7) + 27) points may be scored. An exception exists if the opponent  and leaves the incoming player  on all the remaining reds. In such a situation, the player can nominate one of the other  as a red, known as a "", which carries the same value as a red for just that shot, and therefore, a century break is still possible with only nine reds left.

This has happened only once in professional competition, when Jamie Burnett made a 148 at the qualifying stage of the 2004 UK Championship.

A "century of centuries" refers to a total of 100 breaks of at least 100 points each. By December 2001, only 15 players had reached this milestone in professional snooker tournaments. With the increased occurrence of centuries compiled in professional competition in the past decades, another 27 players had achieved a "century of centuries" by October 2011, bringing the total to 42. By the end of the 2013–14 season, the total number of players reaching the 100 centuries threshold had increased to 52. By the end of the English Open in October 2018, there were 66 players that had reached the 100 century breaks marker.

List of players with 500 confirmed century breaks in professional competition 

The following players are reported to have passed 500 breaks and at least the given threshold above this.

Records

Career
Joe Davis compiled the first televised century break in 1962.
 The record for the most century breaks scored in official tournament play has been held by Ronnie O'Sullivan since January 2015, when he broke the record of 775 career centuries previously held by Stephen Hendry.
 The first player to have recorded 1,000 centuries in public performance is Horace Lindrum. Ronnie O'Sullivan is the only player to have compiled more than 1,000 century breaks in professional competition, having achieved his 1,000th century at the 2019 Players Championship on 10 March 2019.
Stacey Hillyard became the first female player to record a competitive century in January 1985.
 The fastest recorded century break in tournament play was by Tony Drago at the 1996 UK Championship – he took 3 minutes 31 seconds (211 seconds) to score one hundred points.
 The youngest player to record a century break is Michael White, who scored his first century in March 2001 at the age of nine.

Season
Hendry was the first player to reach 50 century breaks in a season, compiling 53 in the 1994–95 season. He again exceeded 50 centuries in the 1995–96 season, with 51, and O'Sullivan came close with 48 in the 2006–07 season.
Hendry's record was broken in the 2010–11 season by Mark Selby with 54 centuries, and again by Selby with 55 century breaks in the 2011–12 season. Judd Trump took the record with 61 centuries in the 2012–13 season and the record was broken for the fourth successive season in 2013–14 when Neil Robertson overtook Trump's tally.
The first player to reach the "century of centuries" (100 century breaks) mark during a single season is Neil Robertson, who compiled his 100th century of the 2013–14 season on 30 April 2014 during his quarter-final match against Judd Trump at the 2014 World Championship. In total, Robertson compiled 103 century breaks throughout the season. Judd Trump matched the feat in the curtailed 2019–20 season, compiling 102 century breaks in total.

Event
 The most centuries made by a player in a single match during a professional tournament is seven and the record is shared by Stephen Hendry, Ding Junhui and Judd Trump.
 Hendry set the record during the final of the 1994 UK Championship. During this match, Hendry compiled six centuries in a span of eight frames. 
 Ding tied the record in his semi-final match at the 2016 World Championship. This is also a record for a match at the Crucible Theatre, beating the previous record of six shared by Mark Selby and Ronnie O'Sullivan.
 Trump tied the record in the final at the 2019 World Championship. This equalled Ding's record at the Crucible Theatre and Hendry's record for a final. It also set a new record for a World Championship final at the Crucible, surpassing O'Sullivan's tally of six centuries during the final of the 2013 World Championship.
 Selby's six-century haul in a second round match at the 2011 World Championship set the record for a best-of-25 match. 
 O'Sullivan holds the record for making the most centuries in a best-of-9 match, compiling five centuries (including a 147) to beat Ali Carter 5–2 at the 2007 Northern Ireland Trophy.
 Fergal O'Brien holds the record for most centuries in a best-of-11 match, compiling five centuries to beat Barry Hawkins 6–5 at the 2016 UK Championship.
 The record for combined number of century breaks in a single game by both players is eleven, achieved by Judd Trump (seven) and John Higgins (four) in the final of the 2019 World Championship. This broke the previous record of ten, achieved by Ding Junhui (seven) and Alan McManus (three) in their semi-final tie at the 2016 World Championship.
 The most century breaks in a ranking event is eighteen centuries by Ding during the 2016 World Championship, compiling three during qualifying and a further fifteen at the Crucible Theatre during the main event. Hendry previously set a record of sixteen at the 2002 World Championship, which remains a televised, Crucible and venue record. Mark Williams tied Hendry's records twenty years later at the 2022 World Championship.
 O'Sullivan has compiled more century breaks than any other player in the World Championship competition at the Crucible Theatre. He broke Hendry's record of 127 at the 2013 Championship, extending his total to 179 up to and including the 2020 Championship. John Higgins is the only other player besides Hendry and O'Sullivan to compile more than 100 centuries at the world championship in the Crucible era.
 An aggregate Crucible record of 109 centuries was set at the 2022 World Championship, breaking the previous record of 108 in 2021. The only other time the 100-century threshold has been breached was at the 2019 world championship, with 100.

Consecutive
 The record for the most consecutive centuries in a match is shared by Kyren Wilson and Anthony Hamilton who compiled six between them at a qualifier for the China Open on 11 February 2016. The previous record of five centuries was jointly held by Ronnie O'Sullivan and Stephen Hendry at the final of the 2003 British Open, and by Stephen Maguire and Neil Robertson in a quarter-final at the 2009 Masters.
 Stephen Maguire made five consecutive centuries at the 2004 British Open, comprising the last three frames of his quarter-final and the first two frames of the semi-final.
 Eight players have made four consecutive centuries in a match: John Higgins in the final of the 2005 Grand Prix, Shaun Murphy at the 2007 Welsh Open, Neil Robertson at the 2013 Ruhr Open, Gary Wilson at the 2019 UK Championship, Stephen Maguire in the first round of the 2020 Tour Championship, Mark Allen at the 2020 European Masters, Lu Ning in the 2020 UK Championship, and Jack Lisowski at the 2022 UK Championship. At the 2022 European Masters, Robertson became the first player to do the feat twice.

References

External links

100 (number)
Snooker terminology